Perry Township, Arkansas may refer to:

 Perry Township, Johnson County, Arkansas
 Perry Township, Perry County, Arkansas

See also 
 List of townships in Arkansas
 Perry Township (disambiguation)

Arkansas township disambiguation pages